White Wolf is a 2003 novel by British fantasy writer David Gemmell. It was the penultimate Drenai Series novel written but falls between The Legend of Deathwalker and Legend in terms of chronology.

Plot summary

Skilgannon, a former army general attempts to put his life of violence behind him, becoming a monk. However, this is not to be as he is forced to confront civil unrest in the realm, meeting Druss the Legend along the way and joining him in his quest to save a friend and his daughter.

References

2003 British novels
British fantasy novels
Drenai
Novels by David Gemmell
Bantam Press books